Paris by Night is a 1988 British thriller film written and directed by David Hare and starring Charlotte Rampling, Michael Gambon and Iain Glen. The film was released on DVD by Televista in 2007, but it is considered to be of inferior quality.

Plot
The film concerns Clara Paige, an unhappily married and ambitious British politician, who spends some time in Paris, but gets caught up in a murder.

Cast
 Charlotte Rampling ...  Clara Paige 
 Michael Gambon ...  Gerald Paige 
 Iain Glen ...  Wallace Sharp 
 Robert Hardy ...  Adam Gillvray 
 Jane Asher ...  Pauline 
 Niamh Cusack ...  Jenny Swanton 
 Julian Firth ...  Lawrence 
 Linda Bassett ...  Janet Swanton 
 Robert Flemyng ...  Jack Sidmouth 
 Juliet Harmer ...  Delia
 Alain Fromager ...  Paul Zinyafski
 Christopher Baines ...  Young Organizer 
 Annabel Brooks ...  Girl at Gillvray's Office 
 Edward Clayton ...  Birmingham Chairman 
 Brian Cobby ...  Foreign Secretary 
 Bradley Cole ...  Young Man
 Reg Gadney ...  British Diplomat 
 François Greze ...  Young Hotel Clerk 
 Czeslaw Grocholski ...  Foreign Lecturer
 Peter Whitbread ... English Lecturer
 Sandi Toksvig ... Sandra

References

External links

1988 films
1988 thriller films
Films directed by David Hare
Films scored by Georges Delerue
British thriller films
Films about murder
1980s English-language films
1980s British films